Needleton is an ghost town in San Juan County, Colorado, United States.

Description
Needleton was a station on the old Denver and Rio Grande Western railroad.  The Needleton post office opened in May 1882, and closed in January 1919.  The Needleton station was washed away in the flood of 1927.

Needleton is now a flag stop on the Durango & Silverton Narrow Gauge Railroad. Just north of the flag stop is one of the last of two remaining wooden water tanks on the Durango and Silverton.

Needleton is a popular trailhead for hiking into the Needle Mountains. The most popular hike is to the Chicago Basin.

See also

 List of ghost towns in Colorado

References

External links

 Needle Creek - Chicago Basin trail at US Forest Service
 Needleton rail photos at Rail Pictures
 The ultimate Needleton railphoto?

Geography of San Juan County, Colorado
Ghost towns in Colorado